Vinobraní is a 1982 Czechoslovak film starring Josef Kemr.

References

External links
 

1982 films
Czechoslovak drama films
1980s Czech-language films
Czech drama films
1980s Czech films